The Noricks Chapel School is a historic combination school and church building in rural southeastern Stone County, Arkansas, built around 1907. It was a one-room schoolhouse. It is a simple single-story wood-frame structure, with a gable roof and weatherboard siding. A small belfry stands on the roof ridge, and the main facade has two entrances. It was built c. 1907 to provide schooling to the children of the Noricks Chapel community, and is one of a small number of such rural schools to survive in the county.

The building was listed on the National Register of Historic Places in 1998.

See also
National Register of Historic Places listings in Stone County, Arkansas

References

School buildings on the National Register of Historic Places in Arkansas
One-room schoolhouses in Arkansas
School buildings completed in 1907
Buildings and structures in Stone County, Arkansas
National Register of Historic Places in Stone County, Arkansas
1907 establishments in Arkansas